Majuwana Kankanamage Victor Ivan (Sinhala language: මාජුවානා කන්කානම්ගේ වික්ටර් අයිවන්) is Sri Lankan journalist. He was a Marxist rebel in his youth and later became the Editor of the controversial Sinhalese newspaper Ravaya. He served as the Editor of the Ravaya for 25 years consecutively since its inception. Victor is an investigative journalist, political critic, a theorist, social activist and also an author of several books.

He was the 7th accused of the main court case on the Youth Insurrection 1971. The panel of judges described him as the most colourful character of all suspects respondents. Judgment of the Criminal Justice Commission. Inquiry No, 1 – Government Printer- page 255. He was sentenced to 5 years imprisonment at the end of the inquiry. During his imprisonment he abandoned the doctrine of the JVP as well as that of Marxism. While rejecting the doctrine of violence he became an ardent follower of Mahatma Gandhi adopting the philosophy of non-violence expounded by him.

Early life
Born on 26 June 1949, Ivan was educated at St. Anthony's College, Kandy.

Insurrection
He was a leader of the 1971 insurrection of the Janatha Vimukthi Peramuna (JVP) and used the nom-de-guerre Podi Athula (as opposed to "Loku Athula" the former minister Athula Nimalasiri Jayasinghe). He was unable to take part in the insurrection has he was badly wounded months before while making bombs for it and had undergo surgery at a private hospital in Colombo.

The leaders prosecuting the 1971 April insurrection trail began on 12 June 1972, at the Queen's Club, located at the Baudddhaloka Mawatha, before the Criminal Justice Commission composed of Chief Justice H N G Fernando (Chairman) Justice A C A Alles, Justice V T Thamotheram, Justice H Dheragoda and Justice T W Rajaratnam. Those pleading not guilty were brought in batches before the commission. The main case consisted of 41 suspects which included Mr Ivan. They were considered to be the main architects of the uprising and the youth rebellion. Ivan and several other rebellions were found guilty and were punished with imprisonments.

In 1977 he was released with others on an un-conditional pardon given by Jayawardena Government. Later he joined LSSP and unsuccessfully contested the Galle by-election. He now recalls that the insurrection was a "foolish dream" 

While in prison, Victor Ivan wrote two books: The first was entitled "The challenge of tenant farming" (අඳ ගොවිතැනේ අභියෝගය; published in 1979), which explored the  feudal character of taxation on cultivations and the tenant farming system in Sri Lanka, and its adverse impact on productivity.

The other was on the History of JVP and 1971 Insurrection. In that he claims that the prevailing discriminatory caste system in the Sri Lankan society had been an important contributory factor in the 1971 insurrection. Later, he wrote another book titled "Social background of Youth Rebels of Sri Lanka" in which he argues that the caste system, apart from being a major factor in the youth insurrections in the Sinhala South, has equally become a crucial factor in the youth insurrections triggered by the Tamil youths in the North as well. This is a new dimension that Victor Ivan has added to the intellectual stock of reflective analyses of the social issues of Sri Lanka.

Until then the society in general, and even the social scientists, considered caste a taboo and an issue not to be discussed openly. The insights that he made persistently on this subject has eventually resulted in the social scientists in Sri Lanka too, sharing his view and admitting that the caste constitutes an important factor affecting the social crisis the country is faced today. The report submitted by the Presidential Commission appointed in 1990, pursuant to the suppression of the second JVP insurrection in 1989, to investigate into the factors that had caused the youth insurrections admitted that the caste system had played a crucial role in the Sinhala and Tamil youth uprisings.

Ivan in his book "Pansale Viplawaya" published in Sinhala in 2009, which has been translated into English titled "Revolt in the Temple-The Buddhist Revival up to Gangodawila Some Thera –" has made an in-depth analysis of this proposition explaining the impact of caste discrimination on Buddhist political trends that emerge intermittently in Sri Lanka. In another book written by him on "Caste, Family & Politics" Ivan makes a deep analysis on how the caste system has impacted on politics of Sri Lanka since of independence to date.

Journalism
Victor Ivan entered the field of journalism in 1986, at a time when the country was in turmoil with the outbreak of violent youth insurrections triggered by the Sinhalese in the South and the Tamils in the North. "The Ravaya", the monthly magazine that he launched soon became popular among the readers and turned out to be the magazine of highest demand at that time. Revelation of the presence of radio-active substances in the products of "Nestle" company in the aftermath of the Chernobille Disaster was one of the most remarkable article published by Ravaya magazine.

The Ravaya magazine maintained a critical and analytically approach. It had an average monthly sale of 40,000 copies. With the surge of JVP insurrection, almost all media organisations cautiously refrained from reporting things which were not in favour of the JVP as well as the security forces that were fighting against the JVP. Thus, when all other media agencies remained silent, the Ravaya adopted a bold policy of expressing its views openly. It followed a policy of criticising the excesses committed by both parties – the JVP and the security forces.

During this period, a large number of media people were assassinated by the JVP and the security forces alike on account of their taking sides of either of the two parties. Those who were sympathetic to the JVP came under severe wrath of the security forces and vice versa. The rebels proscribed the 1988 presidential election declaring it is illegal and demanding the voters to boycott it. The JVP adopted a policy of assassinating those who defied their orders. Victor Ivan, through the Ravaya magazine appealed to the people to ignore the orders of the rebels and exercise their right to vote.

The strategy of the JVP was to prevent the unlikely change of the government and create a favourable atmosphere for the candidate of the governing party to win the election and obtain the support of the defeated opposition parties in their pursuit of propelling the youth uprising into a successful end. But Victor Ivan openly declared that if the JVP prevents the government change by force, it will undoubtedly result in the wholesale extermination of the rebels themselves by the government.  It so happened that the ruling party won the election and eventually the JVP was crushed.

Magazine converted to a newspaper
After the defeat of the JVP by the security forces, Victor Ivan upgraded the Ravaya magazine into a tabloid size weekly newspaper. Since then its scope was widened. The Ravaya no longer remained a publication confined to the critics only. It expanded its perspective becoming a newspaper committed to exposing the corruptions and wrongdoings taking place in the country. The average sale of the Ravaya newspaper increased to the level of 80,000 copies per week .It became a visionary guide and the force that inspired the opposition political parties and political movements which had become frail and weak at that time.
The Ravaya led the political campaign that brought Chandrika Kumaratunga back to the political scene and   ultimately raised her in to power.  But Victor Ivan declined to accept any position offered to him by Chandrika after she was elected the President of the country. Later, he became a vehement critic of the rule of Chandrika. The disputes that arose consequent thereof, created an atmosphere where Victor Ivan had to come under   death threats from the rule of Chandrika.

Upon her retirement, President Chandrika Kumaranatunga, got the approval of the Cabinet of Ministers to vest a valuable piece of state owned land in her name. Victor Ivan filed a case against her on this corrupt   transaction (C.A. (Writ) No. 2074/2005). The court ruled out that the land in dispute be revested in the state. Victor Ivan wrote a book titled "Chaurya Rajina"  in sinhala about Chandrika Kumaranatunga and the period of her rule. The English translation of it was published under the title "The Queen of Deceit". The book created an enviable sales record in Sri Lanka. More than 50,000 copies of it were sold in a very short time.

Author work
He is the author of several books including;
 The challenge of tenant farming (Sinhala)1979 – අඳ ගොවිතැනේ අභියෝගය 1979
 The insurrection of '71 (Sinhala)1979 – 71 කැරැල්ල 1979
Sri Lanka in crisis (Sinhala and English) 1989 – අර්බුදයේ ගමන් මග 1988
 The Tamil challenge (Sinhala) 1989 – දෙමළ අභියෝගය 1989 
 The social background of the young rebels of Sri Lanka (Sinhala) 1993 – ශ්රී ලංකාවේ නූතන කැරලිකරුවන්ගේ සමාජ පසුබිම 1993
 From the peace pact to the impeachment (Sinhala) 1993 – සාම ගිවිසුමේ සිට දෝෂාභියෝගය දක්වා 1993
 Principles and Techniques of Chess (Sinhala) 1994 – චෙස් මූලධර්ම හා තාක්ෂනය 1994 
 Violence, Non-Violence and Revolution (Sinhala) 1999 – ප්රචණ්ඩත්වය, අවිහිංසාව හා විප්ලවය 1999
 Freedom, national integration, and family struggle in politics (Sinhala) 1999 – නිදහස, ජාතික ඒකාග්රතාව හා දේශපාලනයේ පවුල් පොරය 1999
 An unfinished struggle (Sinhala and English) 2003 – නොනිමි අරගලය 2003 
 Sri Lanka: A lost paradise (Sinhala and English) 2006 – කදුළු සලන පාරාදීසය 2006 
 The revolution in the temple (Sinhala) 2006 – පන්සලේ විප්ලවය 2006
 The queen of deceit (English and Sinhala) 2006 – චෞර රැජින 2006 
Innocence of the Pen Questioned (Sinhala and English) 2010 - පෑන අහිංසකද? 2009
 චෞර රාජ්යය 2010 
 ප්රභාකරන් පරාජය කිරීම 2010
 මට පෙනෙන හැටි 2010 
 දේශපාලනයේ පවුල හා කුලය 2011 
 ලංකාව ගලවා ගැනීම 2011 
 දෙමළ අභියෝගය 2012
 අවසානය කුමක්ද? 2012 
 ජීවිතයේ ප්රබෝධය, මරණයේ අසිරිය 2013
 අර්බුදයේ අන්දරය, 1815 - යටත් විජිත යුගයේ සිට 2009 - ඊලාම් යුද්ධයේ අවසානය දක්වා

Parliamentary Privileges Act and Criminal Defamation  Law
Victor Ivan challenged the validity of two laws passed by the Parliament that caused great fear in the minds of the media people. This initiative created the appropriate background for abolishing of both these laws. He challenged the legality of the Parliamentary Privileges Act in regard to a case filed against him under the provisions of the said act. There were three other similar cases filed against him under the same Act at that time. He boldly challenged the legitimacy of the law itself and argued successfully that though, the parliament is entitled to safeguard its privileges, the Parliamentary Committee of Inquiry has no right to sit on judgment against people and punish them without having a proper trial procedure approved by law which is an essential prerequisite for instituting legal action and imposing punishments. In view of the wide  publicity given for this  fundamental objection that he raised  against the law itself and  the pressure exerted  by the opposition parties and the international organisations, the parliament was compelled to abolish the parliamentary privileges law and stop the Parliamentary Committee of Inquiry sitting on  cases against  media people  and  imposing punishments on  them.

His next legal battle was against the Criminal Defamation Law which was in operation against the media people. There were 11 cases filed against him under this law. Perhaps, he may be the only journalist in the world against whom such a large number of cases had been filed under the Criminal Defamation Law. According to his interpretation the use of the Criminal Defamation Law against the media people is suggestive of the Attorney General exercising his discretion against people on political grounds which is contrary to the rule of law. In the circumstance, Victor Ivan filed a fundamental rights case against the Attorney General challenging the validity of the practice adopted by him in filing court cases against him (victor) under the Criminal Defamation Law.  He made the Attorney General a respondent both on official as well as on personal level.

Ivan lost the case and he made an appeal to the committee for Human Rights in Geneva under U.N. Convenat on Civil and Political Rights against the verdict of the Supreme Court. The Human Rights Committee in Geneva conducted an inquiry on his appeal (by that time the government had already abolished the Law of Criminal Defamation and had been informed to the Human Rights Committee) and reached the verdict the fundamental rights of Victor Ivan had been violated and ordered to pay compensation for the damage caused to him. (CCRP/C/81/D/909/2000 August 2004)

In the name of the Independence of the judiciary
Of all the struggles made by Victor Ivan, the one he launched against Sarathnanda Silva, the Chief Justice of Sri Lanka (1999– 2009) which he aimed at safeguarding the independence of the judiciary is reckoned  to be the most outstanding and  daring  struggle. 
The Ravaya once exposed a Magistrate who had been accused of raping a female respondent of a court case heard by him. Sarathnanda Silva, the Attorney General, adamantly maintained a rigid stand of safeguarding the accused when the Criminal Investigations Department had confirmed after investigations that the accused magistrate had actually committed the offence. Under the circumstance, Victor Ivan, began to delve into the character of the Attorney General himself on the presumption that he too, might be a corrupt person as much as the accused he was safeguarding. He was able to discover a good incident that revealed the corrupt nature of his character.

When Sarath Nanda Silva was the head of the Court of Appeal, which was prior to his being appointed to the post of Attorney General, his legal wife had left him but not legally separated from him. During this time Sarath Nanda Silva lived with a mistress in his own house who happened to be the wife of a close friend of him. The husband of his mistress, a chemical engineer filed a case against his wife and Sarath Nanda Silva making both of them respondents seeking court approval to dissolve his marriage on account of the immoral behaviour of his wife with Sarath Nanda Silva .  It came to light that the District Judge who heard this case had acted in favour of the Attorney General and in a manner which is oppressive to the chemical engineer and was contrary to the rule of law. The case record and the verdict of the judge amply manifested that the District Judge had been biased and acted as a puppet of the Attorney General.

Ivan exposed the true facts of this case accusing the magistrate and the Attorney General. At the same time he continued to voice against this rapist magistrate, the district Judge who chaired the case against Sarath Nanda Silva and Attorney general which ultimately resulted in the Chief Justice being compelled to appoint 2 tri partite committees to investigate into the allegations made against the magistrate and the district judge. The 2 committees found both of them guilty of the charges levelled against them by Victor Ivan. Apart from this, he filed a case in the Supreme Court against the Attorney General seeking his expulsion from the legal profession on the grounds of his corrupt behaviour. On the basis of his complaint, the Supreme Court initiated an investigation against the Attorney General. While the investigation was in progress, the incumbent Chief Justice went on retirement. Surprisingly, the President appointed Sarath Nanda Silva who had faced corruption charges as the New Chief justice. DatoParam Kumaraswamy of the UNO openly condemned this appointment. Sarath Nanda Silva was a close confidant of the President. The independent stand of the judiciary was not to her liking. She wanted to save her friend from the unfortunate mess he had fallen into and also to find a person like Sarath Nanda Silva whom she could manipulate in wielding her power over the judiciary.

Ivan making a vehement protest against this inapt appointment published the Ravaya newspaper as a Black Issue with a picture depicting the new Chief Justice taking the oath before the President overturned in black background.  Thereafter, he submitted a fundamental rights petition challenging the appointment of the new Chief Justice. The International Bar association and the Law Commission of India making a joint representation sent V.S. Malimath, a retired Chief justice from Kerala to Sri Lanka to observe the proceedings of this historic trial’.

The International Bar Association, in a report published in  November 2001 on caption 'Sri Lanka: Failing to Protect the Rule of Law and the Independence of the Judiciary’ has given a comprehensive account of the illegal manner and ludicrous nature in which this inquiry was held. Victor Ivan, throughout the tenure of the new chief justice vehemently and persistently criticised all illegal actions and injustices that he committed in the arena of judiciary. Based on a comprehensive study of the telephone correspondences over a period of three months he was able to prove that the chief justice has had connections with the underworld. Based on the resultant crisis situation in the judiciary following the appointment of Sarath Nanda Silva as the chief justice, Victor Ivan published a book titled ‘Unfinished Struggle-For the Independence of the Judiciary’ while Sarath Nanda Silva  was holding the post of Chief justice . Addressing  the Second Global Conference of the Investigative Journalists held in Copenhagen from 2–4 May 2003, which he attended on invitation, Victor Ivan shared his experience  of  investigative journalism that he practised in regard to the judiciary of Sri Lanka and the legal battle he had to pursue in the process.

Perception on media
He has an acidic criticism about the media culture in Sri Lanka and some acknowledged theoretical aspects of media as well. His experience and views on the subject are amply expressed in the book titled ‘Innocence of the Pen Questioned' that he published in 2009. He criticised others and similarly let others criticise him. Perhaps, the Ravaya may be the only newspaper which has allowed others to criticise the editor of it in the same newspaper. This can be reckoned to be a new tradition added to the media culture.

Philosophy
Ivan admires Bertrand Russell, so his son is named Athula Russell. Russell was a six-time Sri Lanka chess champion from 2003 to 2010.

References

Sri Lankan rebels
Sinhalese writers
Sri Lankan journalists
Living people
Alumni of St. Anthony's College, Kandy
1949 births
Janatha Vimukthi Peramuna members